Oleksandr Pavlovych Yakovenko (born 23 June 1987) is a Ukrainian retired footballer who played as a left winger.

Club career

He played for FC Metalist Kharkiv, and SK Lierse in the past. In the January Transfer window for the 2007-2008 season, he was loaned out to Anderlecht and made an immediate impact constantly being selected as a starter as well as scoring goals in the domestic league and the UEFA Cup. The following summer Anderlecht signed him on a four-year full-time contract.

After being loaned out for two seasons to Westerlo, Iakovenko chose to be loaned out to Oud-Heverlee Leuven in 2012.

In 2015 he joined ACF Fiorentina. In January 2014 he was loaned to Malaga CF.

Dynamo Kyiv
On 2 February 2016, Yakovenko signed a contract with Ukrainian club Dynamo Kyiv until the end of the 2015/16 season with the option to extend it, signing as a free agent after terminating his contract with his former club Fiorentina. On 30 May it was announced that Dynamo had freed Yakovenko instead of signing a new contract. Whilst in Dynamo, he played in the 1/8 of the UEFA Champions League, who got knocked out 1-3 on aggregate against Manchester City, and won the Ukrainian Premier League which was also his first club title that he won as a player. He was released at the end of the 2015/16 season

Retirement 
After failing to sign for the New York Red Bulls, Yakovenko retired at the age of 29.

Personal life 
He is the older son of the former Ukrainian footballer and current coach Pavlo Yakovenko. His younger brother Yuriy Yakovenko is also footballer.

Honours

Club
Dynamo Kyiv
Ukrainian Premier League: 2015–16

References

External links
 
 Profile at Footgoal
 
 

1987 births
Living people
Ukrainian footballers
Footballers from Kyiv
Ukraine under-21 international footballers
Ukraine international footballers
Ukrainian expatriate footballers
Association football forwards
FC Metalist Kharkiv players
K.R.C. Genk players
Lierse S.K. players
R.S.C. Anderlecht players
K.V.C. Westerlo players
Oud-Heverlee Leuven players
ACF Fiorentina players
Málaga CF players
ADO Den Haag players
Belgian Pro League players
Serie A players
La Liga players
Eredivisie players
Expatriate footballers in Belgium
Expatriate footballers in Italy
Expatriate footballers in Spain
Expatriate footballers in the Netherlands
Ukrainian expatriate sportspeople in Belgium
Ukrainian expatriate sportspeople in Italy
Ukrainian expatriate sportspeople in Spain
Ukrainian expatriate sportspeople in the Netherlands
Association football wingers
FC Dynamo Kyiv players
Ukrainian Premier League players
Association football agents
Ukraine youth international footballers